Seven Sisters Peaks is a  multi-summit massif located in the Bulkley Ranges of the Interior Mountains in British Columbia, Canada. The highest peak of the seven is called Weeskinisht Peak. Precipitation runoff from the mountain and meltwater from the glacier drains into tributaries of the Skeena River. The nearest higher peak is Howson Peak,  to the south-southeast.

Climate
Based on the Köppen climate classification, Seven Sisters Peaks is located in a subarctic climate zone with cold, snowy winters, and mild summers. Winter temperatures can drop below −20 °C with wind chill factors below −30 °C.

Etymology
Seven Sisters Mountain was the name adopted in 1948, but the mountain's toponym was changed and officially adopted October 4, 1951, by the Geographical Names Board of Canada.

The individually named peaks of the massif from west to east are Tlooki Peak, Weeskinisht Peak, Tagai Peak, Tingi Peak, Kitshin Peak, Kletoosho Peak, and Tuatoosho Peak, which are the Tsimshian/Gitxsan words for One, "Top of the Mountain", Three, Four, Five, Six, and Seven, respectively. With the exception of Weeskinisht, the other names were submitted by Neal M. Carter of the Alpine Club of Canada and officially adopted in 1977.

Summits of Seven Sisters Peaks

See also

Geography of British Columbia

Gallery

References

External links
 BC Parks: Seven Sisters Provincial Park
 Flickr photo: Seven Sisters Peaks aerial
 Flickr photo: South aspect
 Seven Sisters Peaks: Weather

Two-thousanders of British Columbia
Hazelton Mountains
Range 5 Coast Land District